"When My Ship Comes In" is a song co-written and recorded by American country music artist Clint Black. It was released in January 1993 as the third and final single from his album The Hard Way.  It reached number one in both the United States and Canada.  The song was written by Black and Hayden Nicholas.

Music video
The music video was directed by Steven Goldmann, and premiered in early 1993.

Chart positions
"When My Ship Comes In" debuted on the U.S. Billboard Hot Country Singles & Tracks for the week of January 16, 1993.

Year-end charts

References

1993 singles
Clint Black songs
Music videos directed by Steven Goldmann
Songs written by Clint Black
Songs written by Hayden Nicholas
Song recordings produced by Clint Black
Song recordings produced by James Stroud
RCA Records Nashville singles
1992 songs